Sherri Baier is a former Canadian pair skater. With partner Robin Cowan, she won the World Junior Championships in  1976, its inaugural year, and then went on to win the Canadian national championships in 1978.

Results
pairs with Robin Cowan

References

External links
 Pairs on Ice: Baier & Cowan

Navigation

Canadian female pair skaters
Living people
World Junior Figure Skating Championships medalists
Year of birth missing (living people)